The Venue was a live music club at 160–162 Victoria Street, London, England, owned by Virgin Records. It opened its doors on 1 November 1978 and operated until 1984. The first act to play there was Graham Parker and The Rumour, followed by the last live performances by Alex Harvey before his death.  Todd Rundgren played some dates there just before Christmas in 1978, as part of the tour to back up the Back to the Bars album; released for the Christmas market, at the time.  Two shows were sometimes played per night, and the ambience was akin to a nightclub, where audience members sat at tables and could have drinks and meals while listening to the acts. It was also popular for use by record companies showcasing new signings to the music media.

Additional info
The original sound system was supplied by Eastlake systems, it was their first foray into live sound. Soon afterwards, Dave Martin from Martin Audio, a company that designed installed and touring PA sound system of the era, replaced the Hidley system with a familiar looking stack of bass bins, mid-range units and HF loudspeakers arrayed either side of the stage. The result was loud and clean, with sound covering the audience far better than the previous rig; sound under the balcony overhang was still problematic, but more the result of poor auditorium design.

The building first opened as the Metropole cinema on December 27, 1929.  After The Venue closed, it was occupied by a Dicky Dirt's discount jeans shop in the mid 1980s and was a branch of the restaurant chain "Ask" prior to its demolition in early 2013 as part of a major redevelopment of the area.

Acts that played at The Venue
(In A-Z order.)
 23 Skidoo
 After the Fire
 Al Green
 Alan Price
 Alan Vega (1 Jun 1982, 23 Oct 1983)
 Alberto y Lost Trios Paranoias (18 Apr 1981)
 Alex Harvey
 Altered Images (23 Sept 1981)
 Angelo Branduardi 2–3 February 1979
 Bert Jansch and Albert Lee
 B-Movie (1984)
 Bethnal (28 April 1979)
 Bette Bright (4 June 1981) - alongside Motor Boys Motor
 Big Country 
 Bill Haley and the Comets (17-20 November 1979)
 Blancmange
 Blue Öyster Cult (19 Aug 1981) - playing under the name Soft White Underbelly
 Blue 1979 - with support band Kokomo
 Brand X
 Bruford
 Bush Tetras
 Cabaret Voltaire (band)
 Captain Beefheart and the Magic Band (12 and 14 Nov 1980)
 Chameleons
 Charlie Dore
 Charlie Haden's Liberation Music Orchestra
 Chaz Jankel
 Chris Rea
 Chuck Berry
 Clint Eastwood & General Saint
 Cocteau Twins (16 Nov 1982)
 Cold Chisel
 David Crosby (21 Apr 1980)
 Curtis Mayfield
 Dave Edmunds
 Defunkt
 Delta 5
 Depeche Mode (23 July 1981)
 Devo (1979)
 Doll by Doll (18 Dec 1979)
 Fad Gadget (16 Feb 1983)
 Famous Blues Blasters
 Felt (15 Sept 1983) - opening for the Smiths
 The Four Bucketeers (22 Feb 1981)
 Freeez
 Furyo / Mecenary Skank (17 Apr 1984)
 Gary U.S. Bonds (14 Aug 1981)
 Gil Scott-Heron
 Ginger Baker's NNG (21 Sept 1979)
 Georgie Fame
 Graham Parker & the Rumour (1 Nov 1978)
 Grandmaster Flash and the Furious Five
 Hall & Oates
 Hambi and the Dance 
 Herbie Hancock
 Hi Tension
 Hugh Masekela
 Icehouse (22 Jul 1981)
 Iggy Pop (with Nico)
 Incredible Kidda Band
 James Blood Ulmer
 James Brown
 Jan Akkerman
 Japan (30 January 1980)
 John Cale
 John Cooper Clarke (10 Dec 1980)
 John Miles (8 June 1979)
 John Stewart
 Johnny Winter
 Judy Tzuke
 Junior Walker and the Allstars
 Kajagoogoo (21 Jan 1983)
 Kate & Anna McGarrigle (4 Aug 1981)
 King Crimson (8 October 1981)
 Klaus Schulze (22 Sep 1982)
 Kokomo (band)
 Legs and Co.
 Level 42 (21 Aug 1981)
 Light Of The World
 Lindisfarne
 Machito
 Magazine
 McGuinn, Clark & Hillman
 Marillion (26 Nov 1982)
 Men at Work (25 Nov 1982)
 Merger (1981)
 Motor Boys Motor (4 Jun 1981) - alongside Bette Bright
 Mink DeVille (Friday 13 Nov 1981)
 Naked Lunch, 21 September 1981
 Nikki Sudden band
 Nina Hagen
 Nine Below Zero
 New  Musik (24 March 1981)
 Paul Brady (6 May 1981)
 Peter Green and White Sky
 Peter Hammill
 Pigbag (9 Dec 1981)
 Q-Tips (11 Sep 1981 and 27 Mar 1982)
 Queen Ida
 Ramones (19 Nov 1981) 
 Richard and Linda Thompson
 Rick Wakeman (22 Aug 1979)
 Rip Rig + Panic (9 Sept 1982)
 Robert Hunter (19 June 1980)
 Robyn Hitchcock (1982)
 Rock Goddess 
 Rocket 88 (featuring Alexis Korner)
 Rockin' Dopsie
 Roger Chapman and the Shortlist
 Roman Holliday
 Rory Gallagher (July 1979)
 Roy Harper
 Shakatak
 Shannon
 Shock (troupe)
 Sniff 'n' the Tears (10 Jun 1981)
 Snips
 Sonic Youth (first London appearance) (1 Dec 1983)
 Sonny Terry and Brownie Mcghee
 Southside Johnny & The Asbury Jukes (on the 1983 Trash It Up! tour)
 Spirit
 Steve Hackett
 Steve Harley and Cockney Rebel
 Steve Hillage (10 Apr 1979)
 Stevie Ray Vaughan (8 Sept 1983)
 Sun Ra
 Sylvester and the Two Tons O' Fun (4 July 1979)
 Taj Mahal
 The Alarm - (7 December 1981) - opening for The Fall
 The Armoury Show
 The Birthday Party
 The Blow Monkeys (16 Feb 1983) - opening for Fad Gadget
 The Blues Band
 The Cars
 The Charlie Daniels Band
 The Cramps
 The Fall  (7 December 1981) - supported by The Alarm
 The Go-Betweens (15 Sept 1983) - opening for the Smiths
 The Go-Go's
 The Members (11 Apr 1981)
 The Monochrome Set (5 March 1981, 26 July 1982, 2 November 1982)
 The Passions (17 Oct 1981)
 The Piranhas (1981)
 The Polecats (4 Apr 1981)
 The Pretty Things
 The Rivits (featuring Jess Roden)
 The Roches
 The Skids (10 February 1981. Live broadcast by Capital Radio. Final live performance with the band by guitarist Stuart Adamson and drummer Mike Baillie)
 The Slits
 The Smiths (15 Sept 1983)
 The Sugarhill Gang (Feb 1980)
 The Vapors (27 Mar 1981)
 The Yachts
 T34 (three times in 1982) (This is not T-34, the rock band featuring Al Murray.)
 Tik and Tok
 Tina Turner (16 Dec 1983)
 Tito Puente
 Todd Rundgren (Dec 1978)
 Tom Verlaine (9 and 10 June 1982)
 Tuxedomoon
 UK
 U2 (18 Dec 1979)
 Violinski (May 1079)
 Virgin Prunes (March 1981)
 Wang Chung (4 Feb 1982) (as "Huang Chung")
 Wilko Johnson
 XTC (1980)
 Yellow Magic Orchestra (16 & 24 October 1979)
 Zeitgeist

References

External links
 Photos of the Venue - Flickr set by dusashenka
 Various Venue posters etc - A lot of bands are listed on posters here, although it is quite hard to see the dates
 More Venue related images

Music venues in London
Victoria, London
1978 establishments in England
1994 disestablishments in England